Sud Yungas or Sur Yungas (Aymara: Aynach Yunka jisk'a) is a province in the Bolivian department of La Paz. It was created during the presidency of José Manuel Pando on January 12, 1900. The capital of the province is Chulumani.

Geography 
The Cordillera Real traverses the province. Other mountains are listed below:

Subdivision 
The province is divided into five municipalities.

See also 
 Jach'a Quta
 Laram Quta
 Pilón Lajas Biosphere Reserve and Communal Lands

References 

Provinces of La Paz Department (Bolivia)
Yungas